Trout is the common name given to a number of species of freshwater fish.

Trout may also refer to:

Places
 Trout Beck, a river in the Lake District, England
 Trout Creek (disambiguation)
 Trout Island, Graham Land, Antarctica
 Trout Lake (disambiguation)
 Trout River (disambiguation)
 Trout Run (disambiguation)

United States
 Trout, Kentucky, an unincorporated community
 Trout, Louisiana, an unincorporated community
 Trout Island, Charlevoix County, Michigan
 Trout, West Virginia, an unincorporated community
 Trout Pond, West Virginia

Music
 Trout Records, the record label for Trout Fishing in America
 Trout Quintet, a piano quintet based on the song by Franz Schubert
 "Die Forelle" or "The Trout", a lied by Franz Schubert
 "Trout", a song by Neneh Cherry from the album Homebrew

Films
 Las truchas (Trouts), a 1978 Spanish film
 The Trout (film), a 1982 French film

Other uses
 Trout (surname), a list of people and fictional and mythological characters
 USS Trout, two US Navy submarines
 The Trout Inn or The Trout, a public house in Oxford, England
 Trout Inn, Lechlade, a pub in Gloucestershire, England